Zlatan Muslimović (born 6 March 1981) is a Bosnian former professional footballer who played as a forward.

Early career
As a teenager, Muslimović played for the Swedish teams Habo IF and Husqvarna FF. He went on to play for the Swedish team IFK Göteborg youth team in 1998 and 1999, before coming to Italy in 2000.

Muslimović was also a goalkeeper for the Brandstorps IF floorball club's team for boys' born in 1981 during the 1994–95 season.

Club career

Italy
Muslimović signed his first professional contract with Udinese. During the 2004–05 season, he was the top scorer of Serie C1/A side Rimini, with 15 goals in 32 matches, helping his team in winning the league and being promoted to Serie B. In 2006–07 he was loaned to Parma. In June 2007, he signed for Serie A side Atalanta (in a direct swap with Marco Motta) but suffered from lack of playing time under head coach Luigi Delneri.

PAOK

On 22 July 2008, Muslimović signed with Greek club PAOK on a three-year deal. He instantly became a fan favourite and largely contributed to PAOK's successful run in the 2008–09 season. He scored his first goal for PAOK in a friendly against Udinese and his first league goal in a home game against AEK Athens. He received the nickname "Alani" by the Gate 4 fans.

During the 2009–10 season, however, he began facing many injury problems and managed to score only four times while his playing time kept diminishing.
His most memorable goal was in the 2010–11 UEFA Europa League play-offs, when he netted a 101st minute 1–1 equalizer against Fenerbahçe, sending PAOK through to the group stages. After another disappointing season, however, it was decided that his contract would not be renewed; his last official game for PAOK was against Olympiakos Volou on 25 May 2011, where he also scored.

Guizhou Renhe
On 20 February 2012, after being without a club for nine months, Muslimović signed with Chinese Super League side Guizhou Renhe. On 8 April, scored his first goal for the senior Guizhou Renhe side.

International career
Muslimović has made 30 appearances for the Bosnia and Herzegovina national team since making his debut in August 2006 in a friendly match against France as a second-half substitute. He also played for the team in their UEFA Euro 2008 qualifying matches against Malta (twice), Hungary, Norway and Turkey. Against Croatia, he scored a hat-trick.

One of Muslimović's most memorable games was the encounter with Norway in Oslo. He and midfielder Zvjezdan Misimović scored early goals in the first half giving Bosnia a night to remember on 24 March 2007 with a 2–1 victory. He turned in another solid performance in the match against Turkey by slotting home a pass from Misimović past Rüştü Reçber to level the score at 1–1. Bosnia went on to win the game 3–2 with 89th-minute substitute Adnan Čustović heading in from a corner.

Muslimović is one of only six national players (with Elvir Bolić, Elvir Baljić [who scored four goals in one game], Zvjezdan Misimović, Vedad Ibišević and Edin Džeko) to ever score a hat-trick for Bosnia, doing so during a friendly against Croatia.

In the qualifying rounds for the 2010 FIFA World Cup in South Africa in November 2009, Bosnia was eliminated by Portugal; Muslimović's shot hit the goalpost during the match in Lisbon.

His final international was a September 2011 European Championship qualification match away against Belarus.

Career statistics

Club

International 
International goals

Honours
Rimini
 Serie C1: 2004–05
 Supercoppa di Serie C: 2005

PAOK
Super League Greece: Runner up 2008–09

Guizhou Renhe
 Chinese FA Cup: 2013
 Chinese FA Super Cup: 2014

References

External links
 
 

1981 births
Living people
Sportspeople from Banja Luka
Swedish people of Bosnia and Herzegovina descent
Bosnia and Herzegovina emigrants to Sweden
Association football forwards
Swedish footballers
Bosnia and Herzegovina footballers
Bosnia and Herzegovina under-21 international footballers
Bosnia and Herzegovina international footballers
Udinese Calcio players
A.C. Perugia Calcio players
U.S. Pistoiese 1921 players
Ascoli Calcio 1898 F.C. players
Calcio Padova players
Rimini F.C. 1912 players
A.C.R. Messina players
Parma Calcio 1913 players
Atalanta B.C. players
PAOK FC players
Beijing Renhe F.C. players
NK Zavrč players
FC Koper players
Serie A players
Serie B players
Serie C players
Super League Greece players
Chinese Super League players
Slovenian PrvaLiga players
Bosnia and Herzegovina expatriate footballers
Expatriate footballers in Italy
Bosnia and Herzegovina expatriate sportspeople in Italy
Expatriate footballers in Greece
Bosnia and Herzegovina expatriate sportspeople in Greece
Expatriate footballers in China
Bosnia and Herzegovina expatriate sportspeople in China
Expatriate footballers in Slovenia
Bosnia and Herzegovina expatriate sportspeople in Slovenia